Portugal changed to a closed telephone numbering plan on 31 October 1999; previously, the trunk prefix was '0', but this was dropped.

For landline subscribers, the area code, prefixed by the digit '2', was incorporated into the subscriber's number. For mobile subscribers, formerly seven (to call another subscriber using the same operator) or eleven (to call any mobile subscriber) digits were used. For special number ranges, formerly ten digits were used, but the initial '0' was dropped. These changes made that nine digits were used for all calls after 1999.

Before 1999 Portugal Telecom controlled Portugal's entire landline telephone network. On 16 December 1999 Anacom announced that the market would be opened to competitors on 1 January 2000.

Geographic numbering
Numbering examples for Lisbon area:

          xxx xxxx  (before 1999, within Lisbon)
       01 xxx xxxx  (before 1999, within Portugal, including Lisbon)
  +351  1 xxx xxxx  (before 1999, outside Portugal)
       2x xxx xxxx  (after 1999, within Portugal, including Lisbon)
       2x(x) xxx xxx  (present day, within Portugal, including Lisbon)
  +351 21 xxx xxxx  (after 1999, outside Portugal)
  +351 2x(x) xxx xxx  (present day, outside Portugal)

Mobile telephone numbering
Mobiles similarly changed, with the digits 9T replacing the prefix 093T, where T is a digit specific to a mobile operator, that can be 1 (Telecel, now Vodafone Portugal), 0, 2 or 6 (TMN/MEO) or 3 (Optimus/NOS):

           xxx xxxx  (before 1999 for Portuguese subscribers using the same mobile operator)
      093T xxx xxxx  (before 1999 within Portugal, T=1,3,6)
  +351 93T xxx xxxx  (before 1999 outside Portugal, T=1,3,6) 
        9T xxx xxxx  (after 1999 within Portugal, T=1,3,6,2)
  +351  9T xxx xxxx  (after 1999 outside Portugal, T=1,2,3,6)
  +351  9Tx xxx xxx  (present day outside Portugal, T=1,3,6,2,0)

Other numbering
New number ranges include:

  10xx        Carrier selection codes
  30x xxx xxx VoIP carriers
  607 xxx xxx Premium rate
  7xx xxx xxx Flat tariff, private networks, inter-operator routing
  884 xxx xxx Personal numbering
  882 xxx xxx Virtual card services 
  800 xxx xxx Freephone
  808 xxx xxx Shared cost
  809 xxx xxx Shared cost

Prefix list
Source:

References

Portugal
Telephone numbers